The 1988 NCAA Division I baseball season, play of college baseball in the United States organized by the National Collegiate Athletic Association (NCAA) began in the spring of 1988.  The season progressed through the regular season and concluded with the 1988 College World Series.  The College World Series, held for the forty second time in 1988, consisted of one team from each of eight regional competitions and was held in Omaha, Nebraska, at Johnny Rosenblatt Stadium as a double-elimination tournament.  Stanford claimed the championship for the second time.

Realignment and format changes
Armstrong State moved its athletic program back to NCAA Division II.  The Big South Conference dissolved its two division format and played as a single conference of seven members.
The Big Ten Conference dissolved its two division format, playing as a single conference of ten members.

Conference winners
This is a partial list of conference champions from the 1988 season.  The NCAA sponsored regional competitions to determine the College World Series participants.  Each of the eight regionals consisted of six teams competing in double-elimination tournaments, with the winners advancing to Omaha.  27 teams earned automatic bids by winning their conference championship while 21 teams earned at-large selections.

Conference standings
The following is an incomplete list of conference standings:

College World Series

The 1988 season marked the forty second NCAA Baseball Tournament, which culminated with the eight team College World Series.  The College World Series was held in Omaha, Nebraska.  The eight teams played a double-elimination format, with Stanford claiming their second championship with a 9–4 win over Arizona State in the final.

Award winners

All-America team

References